Au roi de la bière is a former brasserie in the 8th arrondissement of Paris, France. It has been an official Historic Monument since 1997.

Location 
Au roi de la bière is located at 119 Rue Saint-Lazare in the 8th arrondissement, near the Saint-Lazare train station.

Architecture 
The building stands on a narrow plot of about 10 meters wide. It has a ground floor, three upper floors and an attic. Its façade is made of bricks and varnished timber framing in an Alsatian regionalist style. The chimney features a stork statue. The central part of the façade has a statue of Gambrinus, the legendary king of beer.

History 
The original restaurant was built in 1892 by architect Chausson. In 1894, the façade was completely modified and the building was raised by architect Paul Marbeau on behalf of Alsatian restaurateur Jacqueminot Graff.

The Alsatian-style façade and the roof (including the storck and Gambrinus statues), as well as the three adjoining rooms of the ground floor, were registered as a Historic Monument on November 18, 1997.

The building became a McDonald's restaurant in 1998.

References 

Buildings and structures in the 8th arrondissement of Paris
Buildings and structures completed in 1892
Monuments historiques of Paris
Restaurants in Paris
McDonald's buildings and structures